The Lily is a 1926 American drama film directed by Victor Schertzinger and written by Eve Unsell. It is based on the 1923 play The Lily by David Belasco. The film stars Belle Bennett, Ian Keith, Reata Hoyt, Barry Norton, John St. Polis and Richard Tucker. The film was released on October 3, 1926, by Fox Film Corporation.

Cast         
Belle Bennett as Odette
Ian Keith as George Arnaud
Reata Hoyt as Christiane
Barry Norton as Max de Maigny
John St. Polis as Comte de Maigny
Richard Tucker as Huzar
Gertrude Short as Lucie Plock
James A. Marcus as Emile Plock 
Lydia Yeamans Titus as Housekeeper
Tom Ricketts as Jean 
Vera Lewis as Mrs. Arnaud Sr.
Betty Francisco as Mrs. Arnaud Jr.
Carmelita Geraghty as Old Comte's Mistress

References

External links
 

1926 films
1920s English-language films
Silent American drama films
1926 drama films
Fox Film films
Films directed by Victor Schertzinger
American silent feature films
American black-and-white films
1920s American films